Gottlieb Tobias Wilhelm (16 October 1758 Augsburg - 12 December 1811 Augsburg) was a Protestant pastor and natural history writer, probably best known for his monumental "Unterhaltungen aus der Naturgeschichte" ("Wilhelm's Discourses on Natural History").

He was the fourth of 14 children and son of Augsburg engraver and publisher Christian Art Wilhelm, proprietor of Martin Engelbrecht Art Dealer. He attended the Gymnasium bei St. Anna from 1767 to 1777, and between 1777 and 1781 studied theology, philosophy and philology in Leipzig under Professor Ernst Platner, Samuel Frederick Nathanael Morus and Johann August Ernesti. From 1781 he was in the service of the Protestant Church in Augsburg, and also a teacher at the high school at St. Anna. From 1786 to 1796, he was a deacon of the Barfüßer (Discalced) Parish, 1796-1806 deacon at St. Jakob and 1806-1811 pastor of the Barfüßer Parish. In 1787 he married Christina Johanna Regina Preu, the marriage being childless. William was a member of several Natural History organisations: "Gesellschaft Naturforschender Freunde zu Berlin“, "Naturforschende Gesellschaft zu Halle“, "Vaterländische Gesellschaft der Ärzte und Naturforscher Schwabens“ und "Regensburgische Botanische Gesellschaft“".

Wilhelm was a popular preacher and author of items that were mostly anonymously written for calendars, almanacs and magazines. From 1792 publication of his "Unterhaltungen aus der Naturgeschichte" (Discourse on Natural History) in weekly instalments from his father's publishing house, with illustrations by renowned Augsburg engravers such as Jacob Xaver Schmuzer. Overall scope of the work: 25 volumes (with a total of 1469 illustrations), 19 volumes by Wilhelm himself. From 1808 it was reprinted by Pichler of Vienna. From 1798 a French translation of "Insects" at Haag in Basel (3 vols.).

External links
Archive download
Flickr

References

1758 births
1811 deaths
Protestant writers
Protestant religious leaders